Naro-Fominsk is a town and the administrative center of Naro-Fominsky District in Moscow Oblast, Russia, located on the Nara River,  southwest from Moscow. Population:

History
The Fominskoye village was first mentioned in chronicles in 1339, while it was under the rule of Ivan Kalita. Napoleon's Grande Armée passed through Fominskoye on its retreat from Moscow in 1812. The modern Naro-Fominsk was established as an urban-type settlement as a result of the merger of the villages of Fominskoye, Malaya Nara and Malkovo in 1925. Town status was granted to it in 1926. The town was severely damaged during World War II after Nazi Germany forces destroyed 687 buildings and a textile factory during the Battle of Moscow in 1941. Western part of Naro-Fominsk was occupied from October 21 to December 26, 1941. Naro-Fominsk was liberated by the 33rd army under the command Mikhail Grigoryevich Yefremov.

Naro-Fominsk silk factory was the first in the USSR to produce fabric "Bologna" in the early 1960s.

Administrative and municipal status
Within the framework of administrative divisions, Naro-Fominsk serves as the administrative center of Naro-Fominsky District. As an administrative division, it is, together with twelve rural localities, incorporated within Naro-Fominsky District as the Town of Naro-Fominsk. As a municipal division, the Town of Naro-Fominsk is incorporated within Naro-Fominsky Municipal District as Naro-Fominsk Urban Settlement.

Transportation
The Moscow–Kyiv railway passes through the town.

Military
The town is home to the 4th Guards Kantemirovskaya Tank Division, part of the Western Military District.

Twin towns – sister cities

Naro-Fominsk is twinned with:
 Babruysk, Belarus
 Daugavpils, Latvia
 Elin Pelin, Bulgaria

References

Notes

Sources

External links
 Official website of Naro-Fominsk
Pictures of Naro-Fominsk

Cities and towns in Moscow Oblast